Shoreham was a parliamentary constituency centred on the town of Shoreham-by-Sea in West Sussex.  It returned one Member of Parliament (MP)  to the House of Commons of the Parliament of the United Kingdom from 1974 to 1997.

Before the 1885 general election, the Parliamentary borough of New Shoreham, also known simply as Shoreham, returned two members to the House of Commons.

History
This was a safe Conservative seat throughout its existence.

Boundaries
1974-1983: The Urban Districts of Shoreham and Southwick, the Rural District of Chanctonbury, and in the Rural District of Worthing the parishes of Coombes, Findon, Houghton, Lancing, and Sompting.

1983-1997: The District of Adur, and the District of Arun wards of Angmering, East Preston and Kingston, Ferring, Findon, Rustington East, and Rustington West.

The constituency was created for the February 1974 general election, when the Arundel and Shoreham constituency was divided.  It was abolished for the 1997 general election, when it was largely replaced by the new East Worthing and Shoreham constituency.

Members of Parliament

Elections

Elections in the 1990s

Elections in the 1980s

Elections in the 1970s

See also
List of parliamentary constituencies in West Sussex

Notes and references

Sources
 Boundaries of Parliamentary Constituencies 1885-1972, compiled and edited by F.W.S. Craig (Parliamentary Reference Publications 1972)
 The Parliaments of England by Henry Stooks Smith (1st edition published in three volumes 1844–50), second edition edited (in one volume) by F.W.S. Craig (Political Reference Publications 1973) out of copyright
 Victoria History of the County of Sussex - south part of the Rape of Bramber

Adur District
Parliamentary constituencies in South East England (historic)
Constituencies of the Parliament of the United Kingdom established in 1974
Constituencies of the Parliament of the United Kingdom disestablished in 1997
Politics of West Sussex